The Socialist Review was a monthly magazine of the British Socialist Workers Party. As well as being printed it is also published online.

Original publication: 1950–1962
The Socialist Review was set up in 1950 as the main publication of the Socialist Review Group (SRG). It began as a duplicated magazine, the parent group only being able to afford to have it printed from 1954 onwards. In its last years it lost its central importance to the SRG due to the launch in 1960 of a new journal International Socialism and in 1961 a newspaper, Industrial Worker that then became Labour Worker and subsequently the weekly Socialist Worker. Socialist Review was discontinued in 1962 – the year in which the SRG became the International Socialists.

Monthly magazine: 1978–2005
In 1978 the title Socialist Review was launched by the Socialist Workers Party, as the IS had become known. The monthly magazine was renamed Socialist Worker Review in the 1990s later reverting to the better known title and has remained the monthly magazine of the SWP.

In 2003, the selling of the SWP's in-house printing press, for which they give the reason that it was outdated technology that was too expensive to replace, forced them to find new printers for the magazine; Warners Midlands plc. This opened up the opportunity of full colour throughout and of a more professional appearance generally. This has helped to further the push for wider readership particularly outside the ranks of the SWP. The final issue in this format, number 302, was published in December 2005.

Editors
The final editor of SR in this format was Chris Nineham. The magazine was edited by Lindsey German, who is convener of the Stop the War Coalition, till May 2004 and from June 2004 to October, 2005 by Peter Morgan.

Supplement to Socialist Worker: 2006–2007
At the SWP conference in January 2006, a plan was put forward to radically change the format of Socialist Review, turning it into a monthly supplement for Socialist Worker, though retaining the cover price so it could continue to be sold separately. The stated reason for the change was: "The new magazine would draw upon the strengths of both Socialist Worker and Socialist Review and will use the better sale and distribution of the paper to reach a wider audience." The first issue in this format appeared in February 2006.

Monthly magazine: 2007–2020 
Socialist Review reverted to being a separate magazine in May 2007, edited first by Judith Orr, and now Sally Campbell. Regular writers include Mark Serwotka, Billy Hayes and Lindsey German. Since the relaunch it has carried interviews with figures such as Naomi Klein, George Galloway, Tony Benn, Tom Morello and Howard Zinn, and features by Francis Beckett and István Mészáros.

References

External links
Online version
Socialist Review index, 1950-1962 
Socialist Review index, 1978-2005
Socialist Workers Party

1950 establishments in the United Kingdom
Political magazines published in the United Kingdom
Monthly magazines published in the United Kingdom
Magazines established in 1950
Socialist magazines
Socialist Workers Party (UK)
Trotskyist works
Marxist magazines